HMS Quorn was a  destroyer of the Royal Navy, built in 1940 and sunk off the Normandy coast on 3 August 1944. The class were named after British fox and stag hunts, in this case, the Quorn Hunt, predominantly based in Leicestershire.

Quorn was built by J. Samuel White and Co. at Cowes, Isle of Wight.  A  Type 1 Hunt-class destroyer, she was launched on 27 March 1940 and completed on 21 September 1940 with the pennant number L66. She was adopted by the civil community of Rushden, Northamptonshire, as part of Warship Week in 1942.

Service history

1941
Quorn joined the 21st Destroyer Flotilla at Harwich.  The flotilla was tasked with convoy protection, anti-shipping and patrol duties. Quorn would stay with the flotilla for the whole of her commission.  In April Quorn was superficially damaged by two delay-action bombs, that exploded  from her port quarter.

She was repaired at Chatham Dockyard. This took until September to complete.

1942
In April Quorn hit another mine that blew a  hole in the port side of the ship. Two of ship's company were killed and one injured. Her No 1 boiler room was flooded and major structural damage sustained. She was towed to Harwich and then to Sheerness where repairs took 4 months to complete.

On 13 October Quorn was one of the five destroyers that intercepted the German auxiliary cruiser  in the English Channel. Komet was sunk and two M-class minesweepers were heavily damaged and set on fire.  An hour later a second patrolling force of the same operation engaged a group of escort vessels, sinking an R boat, (minesweeper) and damaging a torpedo boat.

1943
North Sea convoy protection duties with the 21st Destroyer Flotilla

1944
In June Quorn was an escort for convoys of personnel during Operation Neptune, the naval support of Operation Overlord, the Normandy Landings. On 3 August, she was hit and sunk by a human torpedo piloted by Oberfernschreibmeister Herbert Berrer of the Kriegsmarine during a heavy attack on the British assault area by a force of E-boats, Linse explosive motorboats, human torpedoes and low flying aircraft. Those that survived the initial attack spent up to eight hours in the water before being rescued, and many of these died. One hundred and thirty of her crew were lost.

References

Publications
 Colledge, J. J. & Warlow, Ben: Ships of the Royal Navy - The Complete Record of all Fighting Ships of the Royal Navy from the 15th Century to the Present. Newbury, UK: Casemate, 2010. 
 English, John: The Hunts - A history of the design, development and careers of the 86 destroyers of this class built for the Royal and Allied Navies during World War II. Cumbria: World Ship Society, 1987. 
 Whitley, M. J.: Destroyers of World War Two – an international encyclopedia: Arms and Armour, 1988. 
 Gardiner, Robert: Conway's All the World's Fighting Ships 1922–1946: Conway Maritime Press, 1987.

External links
 HMS Quorn at Uboat.net

 

Hunt-class destroyers of the Royal Navy
Maritime incidents in August 1944
Naval ships of Operation Neptune
Ships built on the Isle of Wight
1940 ships
Ships sunk by German submarines in World War II
World War II destroyers of the United Kingdom
World War II shipwrecks in the English Channel